The discography of American rapper Fabolous consists of 7 studio albums, 2 extended plays, 58 singles (38 as a featured artist), and 11 mixtapes, among various other recordings.

Throughout his career, he’s been primarily known as a flagship artist for Def Jam Recordings and Desert Storm Records, however his first three studio albums were released through Elektra Records and Atlantic Records.

Studio albums

Collaborative albums

EPs

Mixtapes

Singles

As lead artist

As featured artist

Promotional singles

Other charted songs

Guest appearances

Notes

References

 
 
Hip hop discographies